Edson Feliciano Sitta or simply Edson Sitta (born 17 June 1983 in São Bernardo do Campo) is a Brazilian footballer who currently plays as a right back (sometimes as left back) for Paraná Clube in the Brazilian Série B.

Honours
Brazilian League: 2005

External links
 sambafoot
 CBF
 zerozero.pt
 Guardian Stats Centre

1983 births
Living people
Brazilian footballers
Brazilian expatriate footballers
Association football defenders
Campeonato Brasileiro Série A players
Guarani FC players
Clube Atlético Juventus players
Sport Club Corinthians Paulista players
C.D. Nacional players
Ceará Sporting Club players
Paraná Clube players
Vitória S.C. players
S.C. Beira-Mar players
Primeira Liga players
Expatriate footballers in Portugal
People from São Bernardo do Campo
Footballers from São Paulo (state)
21st-century Brazilian people